Vadim Aleksandrovich Virny (born 1965 in Kharkiv, Ukrainian SSR) is a German (formerly Soviet) International draughts player, an International Grandmaster. He was a European champion, World vice-champion and two-times World team champion in International draughts in the 1980s.

Vadim Virny's father is Alexander Yakovlevich Virny, well known as a draughts coach and an author of several draughts textbooks.

Early achievements 
Vadim became a draughts master when he was 13 years old. In 1979, at 14, he won a bronze medal at the World junior championship and the next year for the first time took part in the Soviet championship finals, sharing places 6—10. In 1981 he won the World junior championship in Brussels, defeating another young Soviet player, Alexander Dybman, in the final barrage. In 1983, at the age of 18, he became a European champion in Deventer (Netherlands) and was awarded a Grandmaster title. A month before that he took a second place, losing only to the reigning World champion Harm Wiersma, at a prestigious VOLMAC-Trophy tournament that was later recognized by the World Draughts Federation as a World championship. As a silver medalist he had the right to play a World championship match against the reigning champion next year.

In 1984 Virny met Wiersma in a World championship match and drew it (1+ 18= 1-), a result that allowed Wiersma to retain his crown. During this year he also played in a World championship tournament in Senegal but only shared places 4-5.

In 1985 the Soviet team including Virny won a World Zonal Cup, an unofficial World championship. In 1986 the Soviet Grandmasters won Draughts Olympiade, which is currently counted by the World Draughts Federation as a World team championship. Another team title was won by Virny as a member of the Soviet team at 1989 World team championship in Verona. In between, Virny also won a silver medal at the individual 1987 European championship.

In addition to his international titles, Vadim Virny was three-times (in 1983, 1985 and 1989) silver medalist of the Soviet championships in International draughts and a bronze medalist in 1982.

Since the 1990s 
In 1992 Vadim Virny moved to Germany with his wife, multiple World champion Elena Altchul, and started an IT career, paying less attention to sports. Only in the new millennium he started regularly playing again. In 2006 he won a silver medal at the Netherlands Open championship, the next year he became a silver medalist at the German national championship, and then in 2008—2010 won the national championships three times in a row He returned to the European championships in 2008 and 2010, taking, accordingly, 4th and 5th places.

Personal record at the World and European championships

References

External links 
 Profile at the Website of the Netherlands Draughts Federation

Players of international draughts
Soviet draughts players
Ukrainian draughts players
German draughts players
Living people
1965 births
Sportspeople from Kharkiv